Silvestro Mattei (1653–1739) was an Italian painter of the Baroque period, born and active in Rome and Ascoli Piceno.

Biography
He was born in Ascoli and had been sent by his father to be a pupil of Carlo Maratta in Rome.  He painted two canvases, Virgin of Soccorso and VIrgin with Saints Monica and the Blessed Rita da Cassia and Blessed Chiara di Montefalco for the church of Sant'Agostino in Ascoli.

References

1653 births
1739 deaths
People from Ascoli Piceno
17th-century Italian painters
Italian male painters
18th-century Italian painters
Italian Baroque painters
18th-century Italian male artists